Joel P. West is an American composer, singer, songwriter and guitarist based in San Diego.  He is the lead vocalist and guitarist of the band Joel P. West and the Tree Ring.  He is also known for his collaborations with filmmaker Destin Daniel Cretton, composing such films of his as Short Term 12 (2013) and Shang-Chi and the Legend of the Ten Rings (2021).

Select discography
I Am Not a Hipster (2012)
Short Term 12 (2013)
About Alex (2014)
Grandma (2015)
Janey Makes a Play (2015)
Safelight (2015)
Band of Robbers (2015)
Youth in Oregon (2016)
All Summers End (2017)
The Bachelors (2017)
The Glass Castle (2017)
Just Mercy (2019)
Shang-Chi and the Legend of the Ten Rings (2021)

References

External links
 

Living people
21st-century American composers
21st-century American musicians
21st-century American male musicians
American film score composers
American male film score composers
Musicians from San Diego
Year of birth missing (living people)